Silex is any of various forms of ground stone.

Silex may also refer to:

Places
 Silex, Arkansas, unincorporated community 
 Silex, Indiana, unincorporated community
 Silex, Missouri, village in Lincoln County, Missouri, United States

Other
 Paul Silex (1858–1929), German ophthalmologist
 Proctor Silex, company that produced vacuum coffee makers and other small appliances
 Silex (web framework), micro web application framework written in PHP
 Silex website builder, free and open source HTML website builder
 Separation of isotopes by laser excitation, technique for uranium enrichment